1-acyl-sn-glycerol-3-phosphate acyltransferase gamma is an enzyme that in humans is encoded by the AGPAT3 gene.
The protein encoded by this gene is an acyltransferase (specifically, 1-acylglycerol-3-phosphate O-acyltransferase) that converts lysophosphatidic acid into phosphatidic acid, which is the second step in the de novo phospholipid biosynthetic pathway. The encoded protein may be an integral membrane protein. Two transcript variants encoding the same protein have been found for this gene.

Model organisms				

Model organisms have been used in the study of AGPAT3 function. A conditional knockout mouse line, called Agpat3tm1a(EUCOMM)Wtsi was generated as part of the International Knockout Mouse Consortium program — a high-throughput mutagenesis project to generate and distribute animal models of disease to interested scientists.

Male and female animals underwent a standardized phenotypic screen to determine the effects of deletion. Twenty five tests were carried out on mutant mice and one significant abnormality was observed. Few homozygous mutant animals survived until weaning. The remaining tests were carried out on heterozygous mutant adult mice; no additional significant abnormalities were observed in these.

References

External links

Further reading

Genes mutated in mice